24/7 in Love is a 2012 Filipino romantic comedy film directed by John D. Lazatin, Mae Czarina Cruz-Alviar, Frasco Santos Mortiz and Dado C. Lumibao from Star Cinema. The film was released nationwide on November 21, 2012.
 The film is a romance anthology in which several characters are involved in various crazy antics for love's sake. The ensemble cast is composed of selected Star Magic's talents to celebrate the agency's 20th anniversary.

Synopsis 
Jane (Kathryn Bernardo), a die-hard fan, wants to win tickets to Billy Fernandez's (Daniel Padilla) concert. To do this she must answer the question, "What would you do if it was the end of the world?" In search for this answer she meets different people with different love stories: a 40-year-old virgin named Virginia (Pokwang) who meets a gigolo named Charles (Sam Milby); a hopeless romantic secretary, Barbara (Maja Salvador) who is helping her boss, Ken (Diether Ocampo) with "personal issues"; Belle (Bea Alonzo) who is in love with her gay best-friend, Butch (Zanjoe Marudo), an advertising executive; Verna (Angelica Panganiban) who falls in love with Jane's older brother, Elvis (John Lloyd Cruz), a waiter in Vietnam;  Jomar (Zaijan Jaranilla) an orphan who is trying to court Ayie (Xyriel Manabat) with the help of a 35-year-old mentally-challenged man named Pipoy (Piolo Pascual); Patty (Kim Chiu) who traces her first love, Alvin (Gerald Anderson) to become an underwear model for her company.

Cast and characters

Main cast 
 Kathryn Bernardo as Jane Dela Cuesta
 Daniel Padilla as Billy Fernandez

Supporting cast 
 Piolo Pascual as Pipoy Ronquillo
 Diether Ocampo as Ken Ramirez
 Angelica Panganiban as Verna Francisco
 John Lloyd Cruz as Elvis Dela Cuesta
 Bea Alonzo as Belle Gonzales
 Kim Chiu as Patty Escalon
 Gerald Anderson as Alvin Alvarado
 Maja Salvador as Barbara Alcaraz
 Zanjoe Marudo as Butch Vinzon
 Sam Milby as Charles Padilla
 Pokwang as Virginia Matimtiman
 Zaijian Jaranilla as Jomar
 Xyriel Manabat as Ayie Manrique

Recurring cast 
 Jason Francisco as Jay
 Jason Gainza as Finn
 Joem Bascon as Benny 
 John Lapus as Chang
 Joseph Marco as Gabriel 
 Jane Oineza as Daniella
 Maricar Reyes as Lorraine
 Kaye Abad as Carla
 Jewel Mische as Leah
 Matt Evans as Dave
 Ian Veneracion as Sam
 Wendell Ramos as Juliano

Guest 
 Marc Logan as TV Host
 Marlann Flores as Jona
 Arlene Tolibas as Billy's Manager
 Julia Barretto as Gabriela
 Miles Ocampo as Jamie
 JC De Vera as Patrick
 Alex Medina as Jiggie
 Arjo Atayde as Ron
 Victor Silayan as Timmy

Special participation 
 Coco Martin as Dante 
 Bernard Palanca as Oscar
 Ahron Villena as Steve
 Vice Ganda as Nadine

References

External links
 

2012 films
2010s Tagalog-language films
Star Cinema films
Philippine comedy films
2012 comedy films
Films directed by Frasco Santos Mortiz